Thambotricha is a monotypic genus of moths in the family Epermeniidae. Its sole known species, Thambotricha vates, is also known by the vernacular name wonder-haired prophet. It is endemic to New Zealand. This species is classified as "At Risk, Naturally Uncommon" by the Department of Conservation.

Taxonomy and etymology 
T. vates was described by Edward Meyrick in 1922 from a specimen collected in Wellington by C. E. Clarke.    George Hudson discussed and illustrated the species in his 1928 book The Butterflies and Moths of New Zealand. The holotype specimen is held at the Natural History Museum, London. The vernacular name of this species, "wonder-haired prophet", comes from a translation of its Latin name. The name is as a result of the male having very long hairs on its antenna. The male holotype specimen of T. vates is held at the Natural History Museum, London.

Description 

Meyrick described the species as follows:

Distribution 
This species is endemic to New Zealand. Along with its type locality of Gollan's Valley in Wellington, this moth has also been collected at the Waipoua State Forest in Northland,  in the Hakarimata Range near Ngāruawāhia in the Waikato,  in Taranaki, at Katikati in the Bay of Plenty, and near Aorere River in Nelson.

Biology and life cycle 
Little is known of the biology of this species. T. vates are on the wing in March. This species appears not to attracted to light and has been caught by sweeping during daytime. Males of the species have been however been collected at night with the use of a pressure lamp.

Host species and habitat 
The host species of the larvae of this moth is unknown. This species prefers native forest habitat.

Conservation status 
This species has been classified as having the "At Risk, Naturally Uncommon" conservation status under the New Zealand Threat Classification System.

References

Epermeniidae
Moths described in 1922
Moths of New Zealand
Monotypic moth genera
Endemic fauna of New Zealand
Taxa named by Edward Meyrick
Endangered biota of New Zealand
Endemic moths of New Zealand